is a Japanese fencer. At the 2012 Summer Olympics he competed in the Men's foil, but was defeated in the second round. He won a silver medal in the team foil event.

During the postponement of the 2020 Summer Olympics, Miyake worked as a deliveryman for Uber Eats.

References

Japanese male foil fencers
Living people
People from Ichikawa, Chiba
Sportspeople from Chiba Prefecture
Olympic fencers of Japan
Fencers at the 2012 Summer Olympics
1990 births
Olympic silver medalists for Japan
Olympic medalists in fencing
Medalists at the 2012 Summer Olympics
Asian Games medalists in fencing
Fencers at the 2014 Asian Games
Asian Games gold medalists for Japan
Medalists at the 2014 Asian Games
Japanese male sabre fencers
20th-century Japanese people
21st-century Japanese people